is a side-scrolling run and gun video game developed and released by Konami as an arcade video game in 1991. It is set in the American Old West, where the player takes control of a bounty hunter who is seeking the rewards offered for various criminals.

The coin-op version was released in two variants: a two-player version and a four-player version. Home console versions of Sunset Riders were released for the Mega Drive/Genesis in 1992 and for the Super Nintendo Entertainment System in 1993, to a positive reception. An emulated version of the arcade original was released by Hamster Corporation for the PlayStation 4 and Nintendo Switch as part of the company's Arcade Archives series.

Gameplay

The game, which is set in a fanciful version of the American Old West, revolves around four bounty hunters named Steve, Billy Cool, Bob, and Cormano Wild, who are out to claim rewards offered for eliminating the most wanted outlaws in the West. At the beginning of each stage, the players are shown a wanted poster for the outlaw they will face at its end.

Sunset Riders has gameplay that is similar to both Contra and Vendetta. This cooperative shooter can also be played up to two or four players simultaneously, depending on the version of the game. In the two-player version each player can choose which of the four bounty hunters to play as at the start of the game, while in the four-player version each character is assigned to a different control panel. Steve and Billy wield revolvers, Bob carries a rifle, and Cormano uses a double barrel shotgun. The controls consist of an eight-way joystick for moving and aiming, and two buttons for shooting and jumping. The player(s) can jump between higher/lower floors and slide to avoid enemy attacks.

The objective of the game is to defeat a gang of outlaws in eight stages, with a fight against a strong boss character at the end of each. When two or more people are playing, the one who deals the most damage to a stage boss receives the entire bonus for defeating him. Five of the stages are played on foot, two on horseback, and one on a moving train. A bonus minigame is played after the second and fifth stages, in which the player(s) can earn additional points by shooting outlaws as they pop up. After all eight stages are cleared, the game restarts with increased difficulty.

Power-ups and bonus items can be obtained by entering doorways, defeating certain sack-carrying bandits, or opening sacks placed on the ground. Two power-ups are available, a gold sheriff's badge that grants fully automatic fire and a silver one that gives the player a second gun. Both power-ups can be equipped at once. Other weapons that can be used by the player include dynamite carried by female bandits (which must be thrown back before it explodes), hanging rocks/barrels/torches that can be dropped on enemies, and mounted Gatling guns available only in the last stage. An easter egg involves the defeat of the boss in the fifth stage; if Cormano is active at this point, he will catch the boss's sombrero and wear it for the remainder of the game.

One life is lost whenever the player is hit by any enemy attack, trampled by bulls, caught in a fire or explosion, or struck by a rock or obstacle. Any power-ups that a player has gained are also lost. After all lives are lost, the player may continue the game by inserting more credits, but has a limited amount of time to do so before the game defaults to a game over screen.

Characters
There are four playable bounty hunters in the game who are out to claim rewards offered for eliminating the most wanted outlaws in the West:

Billy is a bounty hunter who wields a revolver and speaks in a western country accent.

Steve is a bounty hunter who also wields revolvers similar to Billy's, though his bullets appear to be more powerful than Billy's own bullets.

Bob is a bounty hunter wielding a rifle who speaks in a southern American accent.

Cormano is a bounty hunter wearing a Mexican poncho and a sombrero who wields a double barrel shotgun that fires a wide spread of bullets. He later wears a red sombrero worn by El Greco after neutralizing him.

In the Sega Genesis version, only Billy and Cormano are playable.

Wanted Outlaws
The outlaws are the recurring bosses of the game as Richard Rose is the final boss at the end of the game.

Simon Greedwell is a rich and greedy outlaw who is the boss of the first stage. He wields a shotgun while ordering his men to deal with the bounty hunters. His last words on death are "Bury me with my money."

Hawkeye Hank Hatfield is a rich outlaw who is known to shoot a gun in one hand and the boss of the second stage. Despite his efforts to kill the bounty hunters, he was neutralized.

Dark Horse is a muscular outlaw who rides an armored horse. He is the boss of the third stage. Once he is neutralized by the bounty hunters, the armored horse runs away along with his corpse.

The Smith Brothers are siblings and outlaws who cause trouble inside a saloon owned by a beautiful woman. They are the bosses of the fourth stage, fought immediately after Dark Horse. After the bounty hunters neutralize the brothers, they watch the can-can performance of three beautiful women on stage, who then inform the bounty hunters about Richard Rose and his three henchmen.

El Greco is one of Richard Rose's henchmen and a Mexican outlaw serving as the boss of the fifth stage. He carries a shield to deflect shots and a whip. Once he is neutralized by the bounty hunters, El Greco tosses away his red Mexican sombrero. If Cormano is being played, he will catch the hat and wear it in place of his own for the rest of the game.

Chief Wigwam is a chief from the native American tribe, an expert in knife throwing and one of Richard Rose's henchmen, serving as the boss of the sixth stage. Despite his efforts to defeat the bounty hunters, he was neutralized but was soon spared by the bounty hunters due to his younger sister's plea knowing he was following Richard's orders. In the Sega Genesis version, Wigwam serves as the boss of the third stage.

Paco Loco is a hulking outlaw who wields a gatling gun, and is one of Richard Rose's henchmen, serving as the boss in the seventh stage. Once he is neutralized by the bounty hunters, his last words are Hasta la Bye Bye! referencing the T-800's main catchphrase in the 1991 film Terminator 2: Judgment Day. In the Sega Genesis version, Paco Loco serves as the boss of the second stage.

Sir Richard Rose is a rich and elegant outlaw, and the main villain of the series, serving as the final boss of the game. He is an expert gunslinger, using his revolver in one hand, and demonstrating his agility at a fast pace. Upon his first "death" he reveals he is using a metal plate to cover his chest and avoid injury. After the second phase, he is finally neutralized by the bounty hunters, symbolized by a graphic showing a single rose being destroyed (not shown in the SNES version). In the Sega Genesis version, he serves as the boss in the fourth and final stage.

Release

In Japan, the arcade game was first published on July 9, 1991. Sunset Riders made its North American debut at the September 1991 Amusement & Music Operators Association (AMOA) show in Las Vegas. Sunset Riders was then released for arcades internationally in October 1991. Two years later, the arcade version was reprogrammed to two home consoles. The home versions were only released in North America and Europe.

Sega Genesis
The Mega Drive/Genesis version of Sunset Riders features the most changes made to the game between the two home versions of the game. Out of the four main characters from the arcade game, only Billy and Cormano are featured. The two characters in the Genesis version were given surnames that they originally did not have in the arcade version (Billy Cool and Cormano Wild). The controls are identical to the arcade version aside from the addition of two shooting buttons instead of just one: one button allows the player to walk and shoot at the same time, while the other shoot button keeps the character still when pressed down, allowing the player to change their aim only.

Only four of the eight bosses from the arcade version are featured (Simon Greedwell, Paco Loco, Chief Wigwam, and Sir Richard Rose), and each of the four chapters are divided into two stages. Each boss dialogue is worded in a text bubble instead of voiced. The power-up icons have also been replaced as well. Unlike the other versions, the player can cause a dynamite stick to explode by shooting it. To access the bonus stages, the player must collect a Star-shaped item located in either stage of each chapter. The bonus stages also differ from the ones in the arcade version: the player chases after a moving wagon on horseback, while the woman in the wagon tosses bonus coins and extra lives at the player's path.

In addition to the standard game mode, the Mega Drive/Genesis version features a two-player versus mode. The players must shoot each other until one of the players runs out of health.

Super NES
In contrast to the Genesis version, the SNES version of Sunset Riders features relatively few changes. The barfly that kisses the player character in Stage 1 as well as the saloon dancers from Stage 4 are dressed more conservatively compared to the arcade version. Hunter dogs, which were present in the first segment of the final chapter in the Genesis version, were removed. The Native American enemy characters from Stage 6 were removed and replaced with regular outlaws, leaving only Chief Wigwam as the stage boss. The dynamite-tossing female bandits were replaced with male bandits as well.

Reception

Contemporary
In Japan, Game Machine listed it on their December 15, 1991 issue as being the third most-successful table arcade unit of the month.

Sunset Riders was well received by the video game press upon release. Sinclair User gave the arcade game an 82% score, opining it "plays very well and should prove an interesting challenge for your finely honed arcade skills." In a more reserved review, Zero rated the arcade original a 3 out of 5, calling it a "fairly fast shoot'em up with a sense of humour."

The "rather splendid" SNES version was given an overall score of 87% by Dan Jevons from Super Play, who described it as "another winner from Konami's stable". It also received an 89% score in SNES Force, with an 88% and an 89% from two reviewers. Hobby Consolas gave the scores of 86% to the SNES version and 78% for the Sega Mega Drive version, while Mean Machines Sega rated the latter as 84%, noting it as "surprisingly good".

Retrospective

Retrospectively, Jamie O'Neill from Nintendo Life awarded the SNES version eight stars out of ten, writing it "is bright, colourful, fantastically well animated, with superb music and sound. It understands its place as a Western game and within the run-and-gun genre, by combining imaginative characterisation and humour, with well-paced action set-pieces, plus variety in its gameplay." Retro Game Age gave it the same score as well, opining "Sunset Riders remains a fun romp that still presents some challenge to get through and is just as fun to play now as it was almost 20 years ago."  Nick Gibson from Sega-16 rated the Sega Mega Drive/Genesis port a 7 out of 10, while it was rated 80% by Arcade Attack.

IGN ranked it as the 88th best game for the SNES. In 2018, Complex listed the game 36th in their "The Best Super Nintendo Games of All Time."

See also
Mystic Warriors
Wild West C.O.W.-Boys of Moo Mesa
List of Western video games

Notes

References

External links

1991 video games
Arcade video games
Cooperative video games
Konami games
Shoot 'em ups
Run and gun games
Sega Genesis games
Super Nintendo Entertainment System games
Censored video games
Video games set in the 19th century
Video games set in the United States
Western (genre) video games
Konami arcade games
Video games developed in Japan
Multiplayer and single-player video games
Hamster Corporation games